Na Dun is a district (amphoe) in the south of Maha Sarakham province, northeastern Thailand.

Geography
Neighboring districts are (from the south clockwise): Phayakkhaphum Phisai, Yang Sisurat, Na Chueak, and Wapi Pathum of Maha Sarakham Province, and Pathum Rat of Roi Et province.

History

The area was made a minor district (king amphoe) on 1 October 1969, when the three tambons, Na Dun, Nong Phai, and Nong Khu, were split off from Wapi Pathum district. It was upgraded to a full district on 25 March 1979.

Administration
The district is divided into nine sub-districts (tambons), which are further subdivided into 94 villages (mubans). Na Dun is a township (thesaban tambon) which covers parts of tambons Na Dun and Phra That. There are a further eight tambon administrative organizations (TAO).

References

External links

amphoe.com

Na Dun